Mike Sapone is an American record producer, composer, audio engineer, and mixer, whose credits include producing records for bands such as Brand New, Taking Back Sunday, Boston Manor, The Front Bottoms, Mayday Parade, Grouplove, Sorority Noise, An Horse, Oso Oso, O'Brother, Cymbals Eat Guitars and Public Enemy.

Timeline 

 May 2020 Kerrang Magazine calls GLUE "Sleek yet somber, visceral yet vulnerable, confident yet cathartic. Boston Manor explore modern life on an exceptional third album." Rating GLUE 5 of 5 K's.

 August 2019 Pitchfork awards Oso Oso's "Basking in the Glow" with its prestigious "Best New Music" honor, Produced and Mixed by Mike Sapone.
 2018 Boston Manor's genre defying "Welcome to the Neighbourhood" slots #3 on Rock Sound Magazines Top 50 Albums of 2018. The album's lead single "Halo" climbs into the top ten Countdown on SiriusXM's Octane.
 2017 brought Sapone his first No. 1 Album and third top 10 on the Billboard 200 chart with Brand New's "Science Fiction" .
 Pitchfork awarded the album with its "Best New Music" merit, the site also awarded the song "Same Logic/Teeth" with the "Best New Track" honor. 
 In August 2016,  Brand New's "I Am A Nightmare" tops the UK Official Vinyl Singles Chart at Number 1 while Brand New's "Mene" sits beneath it at the Number 2 slot.
 2015 ushered Sapone his first No. 1 on Billboard's Top Rock Albums and Alternative Albums chart simultaneously with Mayday Parade's "Black Lines".
 Other Top 10 albums on the Billboard 200 Include Taking Back Sunday's "Happiness Is" and In 2009 Brand New's "Daisy" debuted at number 6 on the Billboard 200 and was featured on the Best Albums Of 2009 lists from SPIN, Kerrang! and Rock Sound magazines.
 Sapone also produced Brand New's critically acclaimed "The Devil And God Are Raging Inside Me," which was included in NME's Top 100 Greatest Albums Of The Decade and received a 5 out of 5-star review entitled "America finally gets their own Radiohead" from Alternative Press magazine.

Discography
Sapone's combined discography has logged over 400 million streams on Spotify alone.
 This Is This by Grouplove (2021)
 In Sickness & In Flames by The Front Bottoms (2020)
 GLUE by Boston Manor (2020)
 Basking in the Glow by Oso Oso (2019)
 Modern Air by An Horse (2019)
 Welcome To The Neighbourhood by Boston Manor (2018)
 Yarn by McCafferty (2018)
 Science Fiction by Brand New (2017)
 Ritual by Envy on the Coast (2017)
 You're Not As As You Think by Sorority Noise (2017)
 Tidal Wave by Taking Back Sunday (2016)
 Aerobed by Cymbals Eat Guitars (2015)
 Panic Stations by Motion City Soundtrack (2015)
 Black Lines by Mayday Parade (2015)
 Sad Strange Beautiful Dream by John Nolan (2015)
 Happiness Is by Taking Back Sunday (2014)
 Headswell by Sainthood Reps (2013)
 Disillusion by O'Brother (2013)
 Nothing To Be Gained Here by NK (2013)
 Heat Thing by Shone (2013)
 Twelve Years by Daytrader (2012)
 Invicta by Hit the Lights (2012)
 Garden Window by O'Brother (2011)
 Feel You're Different by Lights Resolve (2011)
 Lars Attacks! by MC Lars (2011)
 Monoculture by Sainthood Reps (2011)
 Scatterbrain by The Xcerts (2010)
 The Narrative by The Narrative (2010)
 Lowcountry by Envy on the Coast (2010)
 Punk Goes Classic Rock by Various artists (2010)
 I Was Trying To Describe You To Someone by Crime in Stereo (2010)
 Height by John Nolan (2009)
 Daisy by Brand New (2009)
 Flesh by Robbers (2009)
 New Best Friends by Mansions (2009)
 This Gigantic Robot Kills by MC Lars (2009)
 Selective Wreckage by Crime In Stereo (2008)
 Ultra Hot Volcano by Men, Women & Children (2008)
 The Digital Gangster LP by MC Lars and YTCracker (2008)
 Mansions EP by Mansions (2008)
 (Fork and Knife) by Brand New (2007)
 This is a Landslide by Intramural (2007)
 Crime In Stereo Is Dead by Crime In Stereo (2007)
 The Needles The Space by Straylight Run (2007)
 The Devil and God Are Raging Inside Me by Brand New (2006)
 Men, Women & Children by Men, Women & Children (2006)
 The Troubled Stateside by Crime In Stereo (2006)
 The Graduate by MC Lars (2006)
 Split Cd by I Am the Avalanche (2005)
 Prepare to Be Wrong EP by Straylight Run (2005)
 Elektra The Album Soundtrack by Various Artists (2005)
 Tony Hawk's American Wasteland by Various Artists (2005)
 The Early November/I Am the Avalanche Split EP (2005)
 Nightmare of You by Nightmare of You (2005)
 Spider-Man 2 Soundtrack by Various Artists (2004)
 Straylight Run by Straylight Run (2004)
 The Laptop EP by MC Lars (2004)
 Warped Tour 2004 by Various Artists (2004)
 Where You Want to Be by Taking Back Sunday (2004)
 Deja Entendu by Brand New (2003)
 Warped Tour 2003 by Various Artists (2003)
 Taste The X by Ultra X (2003)
 Revolverlution by Public Enemy (2002)
 MTV Road Rules, Volume I by Various Artists(2002)
 Your Favorite Weapon by Brand New (2001)
 The "Tell All Your Friends" Demo by Taking Back Sunday (2001)
 Lightweight Revolution by The Lightweights (1998)
 Jamaican Bonghits EP by The Lightweights (1997)
 Little Bit Of Life EP by The Lightweights (1996)
 Stuttering John by Stuttering John (1994)

 Productions 
Other productions include:

TV show soundtracks: Lethal Weapon, The Blacklist, Smallville, Sons Of Anarchy, Stargate Universe, Studio 60 on the Sunset Strip, Friday night lights, Access Hollywood, Wife Swap, Girls Behaving Badly, E! True Hollywood Story, and The ESPN ESPY awards.

Video Games: Guitar Hero 5, Burnout Paradise, Burnout Dominator, Tony Hawk's American Wasteland, 2006 FIFA World Cup and NHL 2004.

Sapone has also worked, produced, engineered and mixed for the following artists, among others:
 Bad Books Boston Manor Brand New Crime In Stereo Cubic Zirconia Daryl Palumbo (Glassjaw)
 David 'Skully' Sullivan Kaplan (Razorlight)
 Denver Dalley (Statistics, Desaparecidos)
 Envy On The Coast Every Avenue Good Old War Intramural I Am The Avalanche Jaret Reddick (Bowling For Soup)
 Jeff DaRosa (The Exit, Dropkick Murphys)
 John Nolan Kevin Devine KRS-One Lights Resolve Mansions Matt Morris MC Lars Men Women & Children Mike Kennedy (Vision Of Disorder)
 Moving Mountains Nightmare Of You O'BROTHER Ocean Is Theory Public Enemy Robbers Robyn Sainthood Reps Silent Majority Straylight Run The Dear Hunter The Movielife The Narrative Taking Back Sunday The Xcerts''

References

External links
 Brand New on Purevolume
 Mike Sapone Homepage
 Public Enemy Homepage

Record producers from New York (state)
Mixing engineers
Living people
Year of birth missing (living people)